This was Scuba Dice's 1st widespread release and was released to promote the band in mainly the South East of Ireland, prior to the band appearing on You're A Star.

Track listing 
As Ep
 "Made (Demo Version)" – 3:25
 "Your On Your Own" – 3:48
 "Sticky Woo (1927-2005)" – 4:03
 "Maybe Tomorrow" – 4:00
 "Cannot Hide" – 3:41
 "The Evil Dead" – 3:15

As Demo 2
 "Made(Demo Version)" – 3:25
 "Your On Your Own" – 3:48
 "Cannot Hide" – 3:41
 "The Evil Dead" – 3:15
 "Maybe Tomorrow" – 4:00
 "Sticky Woo (1927-2005)" – 4:03

Personnel
 Joe Grace – Vocals
 Padraig 'Scanner' King – Guitar
 Eoin 'Spud' Murphy – Bass, Backing vocals
 Sean Savage - Drums, Backing vocals

Trivia 
The Song "The Evil Dead" is based on the film of the same name, see Evil Dead series

References 

Scuba Dice albums
2006 debut EPs